Candidates and results of the Constituency and aboriginal ballots of the 7th Election of Legislators in Taiwan in 2008.

Most names on this list follow the Tongyong Pinyin romanization used by the Central Commission Committee Website and may not represent the candidates' preferred romanization of their name.

Taipei City

Taipei City Constituency 1
Eligible voters: 258,007
Total votes cast  (Ratio): 159,946 (61.99%)
Valid Votes  (Ratio): 158,300 (98.97%)
Invalid Votes   (Ratio): 1,646 (1.03%)

Taipei City Constituency 2
Eligible voters: 253,636
Total votes cast  (Ratio): 157,585 (62.13%)
Valid Votes  (Ratio): 155,317 (98.56%)
Invalid Votes   (Ratio): 2,268 (1.44%)

Taipei City Constituency 3
Eligible voters: 272,241
Total votes cast  (Ratio): 168,068 (61.74%)
Valid Votes  (Ratio): 165,890 (98.70%)
Invalid Votes   (Ratio): 2,178 (1.30%)

Taipei City Constituency 4
Eligible voters: 280,614
Total votes cast  (Ratio): 171,665 (61.17%)
Valid Votes  (Ratio): 169,272 (98.61%)
Invalid Votes   (Ratio): 2,393 (1.39%)

Taipei City Constituency 5
Eligible voters: 238,616
Total votes cast  (Ratio): 151,986 (63.69%)
Valid Votes  (Ratio): 150,147  (98.79%)
Invalid Votes   (Ratio): 1,839  (1.21%)

Taipei City Constituency 6
Eligible voters: 241,393
Total votes cast  (Ratio): 150,203 (62.22%)
Valid Votes  (Ratio): 148,634  (98.96%)
Invalid Votes   (Ratio): 1,569  (1.04%)

Taipei City Constituency 7
Eligible voters: 238,520
Total votes cast  (Ratio): 146,314 (61.34%)
Valid Votes  (Ratio): 144,612  (98.84%)
Invalid Votes   (Ratio): 1,702  (1.16%)

Taipei City Constituency 8
Eligible voters: 231,411
Total votes cast  (Ratio): 146,614 (63.36%)
Valid Votes  (Ratio): 145,173 (99.02%)
Invalid Votes   (Ratio): 1,441 (0.98%)

Kaohsiung City

Kaohsiung City Constituency 1
Eligible voters: 256,225
Total votes cast  (Ratio): 160,229 (62.53%)
Valid Votes  (Ratio): 158,524 (98.94%)
Invalid Votes   (Ratio): 1,705 (1.06%)

Kaohsiung City Constituency 2
Eligible voters: 212,649
Total votes cast  (Ratio): 131,312 (61.75%)
Valid Votes  (Ratio): 129,808 (98.85%)
Invalid Votes   (Ratio): 1,504 (1.15%)

Kaohsiung City Constituency 3
Eligible voters: 196,798
Total votes cast  (Ratio): 117,177 (59.54%)
Valid Votes  (Ratio): 115,647 (98.69%)
Invalid Votes   (Ratio): 1,530 (1.31%)

Kaohsiung City Constituency 4
Eligible voters: 243,294
Total votes cast  (Ratio): 147,321 (60.55%)
Valid Votes  (Ratio): 145,153 (98.53%)
Invalid Votes   (Ratio): 2,168 (1.47%)

Kaohsiung City Constituency 5
Eligible voters: 237,314
Total votes cast  (Ratio): 138,039 (58.17%)
Valid Votes  (Ratio): 135,775 (98.36%)
Invalid Votes   (Ratio): 2,264 (1.64%)

Keelung City
Eligible voters: 290,672
Total votes cast  (Ratio): 148,278 (51.01%)
Valid Votes  (Ratio): 145,930 (98.42%)
Invalid Votes   (Ratio): 2,348 (1.58%)

Hsinchu City
Eligible voters: 285,433
Total votes cast  (Ratio): 165,893 (58.12%)
Valid Votes  (Ratio): 163,517
Invalid Votes   (Ratio): 2,376

Taichung City

Taichung City Constituency 1
Eligible voters: 237,813
Total votes cast  (Ratio): 140,417 (59.05%)
Valid Votes  (Ratio): 138,135
Invalid Votes   (Ratio): 2,282

Taichung City Constituency 2
Eligible voters: 282,102
Total votes cast  (Ratio): 169,912 (60.23%)
Valid Votes  (Ratio): 167,960
Invalid Votes   (Ratio): 1,952

Taichung City Constituency 3
Eligible voters: 236,692
Total votes cast  (Ratio): 140,738 (59.46%)
Valid Votes  (Ratio): 138,784
Invalid Votes   (Ratio): 1,954

Chiayi City
Eligible voters: 198,751
Total votes cast  (Ratio): 114,025 (57.37%)
Valid Votes  (Ratio): 113,003
Invalid Votes   (Ratio): 1,022

Tainan City

Tainan City Constituency 1
Eligible voters: 290,415
Total votes cast  (Ratio): 175,226 (60.34%)
Valid Votes  (Ratio): 173,023
Invalid Votes   (Ratio): 2,203

Tainan City Constituency 2
Eligible voters: 281,576
Total votes cast  (Ratio): 172,846 (61.39%)
Valid Votes  (Ratio): 170,738
Invalid Votes   (Ratio): 2,108

Taipei County

Taipei County Constituency 1
Eligible voters:
Total votes cast  (Ratio):
Valid Votes  (Ratio):
Invalid Votes   (Ratio):

Taipei County Constituency 2
Eligible voters:
Total votes cast  (Ratio):
Valid Votes  (Ratio):
Invalid Votes   (Ratio):

Taipei County Constituency 3
Eligible voters:
Total votes cast  (Ratio):
Valid Votes  (Ratio):
Invalid Votes   (Ratio):

Taipei County Constituency 4
Eligible voters:
Total votes cast  (Ratio):
Valid Votes  (Ratio):
Invalid Votes   (Ratio):

Taipei County Constituency 5
Eligible voters:
Total votes cast  (Ratio):
Valid Votes  (Ratio):
Invalid Votes   (Ratio):

Taipei County Constituency 6
Eligible voters:
Total votes cast  (Ratio):
Valid Votes  (Ratio):
Invalid Votes   (Ratio):

Taipei County Constituency 7
Eligible voters:
Total votes cast  (Ratio):
Valid Votes  (Ratio):
Invalid Votes   (Ratio):

Taipei County Constituency 8
Eligible voters:
Total votes cast  (Ratio):
Valid Votes  (Ratio):
Invalid Votes   (Ratio):

Taipei County Constituency 9
Eligible voters:
Total votes cast  (Ratio):
Valid Votes  (Ratio):
Invalid Votes   (Ratio):

Taipei County Constituency 10
Eligible voters:
Total votes cast  (Ratio):
Valid Votes  (Ratio):
Invalid Votes   (Ratio):

Taipei County Constituency 11
Eligible voters:
Total votes cast  (Ratio):
Valid Votes  (Ratio):
Invalid Votes   (Ratio):

Taipei County Constituency 12
Eligible voters:
Total votes cast  (Ratio):
Valid Votes  (Ratio):
Invalid Votes   (Ratio):

Taoyuan County

Taoyuan County Constituency 1
Eligible voters:
Total votes cast  (Ratio):
Valid Votes  (Ratio):
Invalid Votes   (Ratio):

Taoyuan County Constituency 2
Eligible voters:
Total votes cast  (Ratio):
Valid Votes  (Ratio):
Invalid Votes   (Ratio):

Taoyuan County Constituency 3
Eligible voters:
Total votes cast  (Ratio):
Valid Votes  (Ratio):
Invalid Votes   (Ratio):

Taoyuan County Constituency 4
Eligible voters:
Total votes cast  (Ratio):
Valid Votes  (Ratio):
Invalid Votes   (Ratio):

Taoyuan County Constituency 5
Eligible voters:
Total votes cast  (Ratio):
Valid Votes  (Ratio):
Invalid Votes   (Ratio):

Taoyuan County Constituency 6
Eligible voters:
Total votes cast  (Ratio):
Valid Votes  (Ratio):
Invalid Votes   (Ratio):

Hsinchu City
Eligible voters:
Total votes cast  (Ratio):
Valid Votes  (Ratio):
Invalid Votes   (Ratio):

Miaoli County

Miaoli County Constituency 1
Eligible voters:
Total votes cast  (Ratio):
Valid Votes  (Ratio):
Invalid Votes   (Ratio):

Miaoli County Constituency 2
Eligible voters:
Total votes cast  (Ratio):
Valid Votes  (Ratio):
Invalid Votes   (Ratio):

Taichung County

Taichung County Constituency 1
Eligible voters:
Total votes cast  (Ratio):
Valid Votes  (Ratio):
Invalid Votes   (Ratio):

Taichung County Constituency 2
Eligible voters:
Total votes cast  (Ratio):
Valid Votes  (Ratio):
Invalid Votes   (Ratio):

Taichung County Constituency 3
Eligible voters:
Total votes cast  (Ratio):
Valid Votes  (Ratio):
Invalid Votes   (Ratio):

Taichung County Constituency 4
Eligible voters:
Total votes cast  (Ratio):
Valid Votes  (Ratio):
Invalid Votes   (Ratio):

Taichung County Constituency 5
Eligible voters:
Total votes cast  (Ratio):
Valid Votes  (Ratio):
Invalid Votes   (Ratio):

Changhua County

Changhua County Constituency 1
Eligible voters:
Total votes cast  (Ratio):
Valid Votes  (Ratio):
Invalid Votes   (Ratio):

Changhua County Constituency 2
Eligible voters:
Total votes cast  (Ratio):
Valid Votes  (Ratio):
Invalid Votes   (Ratio):

Changhua County Constituency 3
Eligible voters:
Total votes cast  (Ratio):
Valid Votes  (Ratio):
Invalid Votes   (Ratio):

Changhua County Constituency 4
Eligible voters:
Total votes cast  (Ratio):
Valid Votes  (Ratio):
Invalid Votes   (Ratio):

Nantou

Nantou County Constituency 1
Eligible voters:
Total votes cast  (Ratio):
Valid Votes  (Ratio):
Invalid Votes   (Ratio):

Nantou County Constituency 2
Eligible voters:
Total votes cast  (Ratio):
Valid Votes  (Ratio):
Invalid Votes   (Ratio):

Yunlin County

Yunlin County Constituency 1
Eligible voters:
Total votes cast  (Ratio):
Valid Votes  (Ratio):
Invalid Votes   (Ratio):

Yunlin County Constituency 2
Eligible voters:
Total votes cast  (Ratio):
Valid Votes  (Ratio):
Invalid Votes   (Ratio):

Chiayi County

Chiayi County Constituency 1
Eligible voters:
Total votes cast  (Ratio):
Valid Votes  (Ratio):
Invalid Votes   (Ratio):

Chiayi County Constituency 2
Eligible voters:
Total votes cast  (Ratio):
Valid Votes  (Ratio):
Invalid Votes   (Ratio):

Tainan County

Tainan County Constituency 1
Eligible voters:
Total votes cast  (Ratio):
Valid Votes  (Ratio):
Invalid Votes   (Ratio):

Tainan County Constituency 2
Eligible voters:
Total votes cast  (Ratio):
Valid Votes  (Ratio):
Invalid Votes   (Ratio):

Tainan County Constituency 3
Eligible voters:
Total votes cast  (Ratio):
Valid Votes  (Ratio):
Invalid Votes   (Ratio):

Kaohsiung County

Kaohsiung County Constituency 1
Eligible voters:
Total votes cast  (Ratio):
Valid Votes  (Ratio):
Invalid Votes   (Ratio):

Kaohsiung County Constituency 2
Eligible voters:
Total votes cast  (Ratio):
Valid Votes  (Ratio):
Invalid Votes   (Ratio):

Kaohsiung County Constituency 3
Eligible voters:
Total votes cast  (Ratio):
Valid Votes  (Ratio):
Invalid Votes   (Ratio):

Kaohsiung County Constituency 4
Eligible voters:
Total votes cast  (Ratio):
Valid Votes  (Ratio):
Invalid Votes   (Ratio):

Pingtung County

Pingtung County Constituency 1
Eligible voters:
Total votes cast  (Ratio):
Valid Votes  (Ratio):
Invalid Votes   (Ratio):

Pingtung County Constituency 2
Eligible voters:
Total votes cast  (Ratio):
Valid Votes  (Ratio):
Invalid Votes   (Ratio):

Pingtung County Constituency 3
Eligible voters:
Total votes cast  (Ratio):
Valid Votes  (Ratio):
Invalid Votes   (Ratio):

Yilan County
Eligible voters: 336,046
Total votes cast  (Ratio): 181,540 (54.02%)
Valid Votes  (Ratio): 178,744
Invalid Votes   (Ratio): 2,796

Hualien County
Eligible voters: 196,692
Total votes cast  (Ratio): 96,216 (48.92%)
Valid Votes  (Ratio): 94,201
Invalid Votes   (Ratio): 2,015

Taitung County
Eligible voters: 119,532
Total votes cast  (Ratio): 58,060 (48.57%)
Valid Votes  (Ratio): 56,952
Invalid Votes   (Ratio): 1,108

Penghu County
Eligible voters: 71,368
Total votes cast  (Ratio): 39,181 (54.90%)
Valid Votes  (Ratio): 38,613
Invalid Votes   (Ratio): 568

Kinmen County
Eligible voters: 63,451
Total votes cast  (Ratio): 27,007 (42.56%)
Valid Votes  (Ratio): 26,564
Invalid Votes   (Ratio): 443

Lienchiang County
Eligible voters: 7,665
Total votes cast  (Ratio): 4,461 (58.20%)
Valid Votes  (Ratio): 4,388
Invalid Votes   (Ratio): 73

Lowland Aborigines
Eligible voters: 156,052
Total votes cast  (Ratio): 66,908 (42.88%)
Valid Votes  (Ratio): 65,522
Invalid Votes   (Ratio): 1,386

Highland Aborigines
Eligible voters: 167,020
Total votes cast  (Ratio): 86,093 (51.55%)
Valid Votes  (Ratio): 84,358
Invalid Votes   (Ratio): 1,735

See also
 2008 Taiwanese legislative election
 Seventh Legislative Yuan

External links
CEC Election Results

Legislative election, 2008
Lists of political candidates
Lists of Taiwanese people
Lists of Taiwanese politicians